Jeziorko may refer to:

Jeziorko, Greater Poland Voivodeship (west-central Poland)
Jeziorko, Łowicz County in Łódź Voivodeship (central Poland)
Jeziorko, Łódź East County in Łódź Voivodeship (central Poland)
Jeziorko, Pabianice County in Łódź Voivodeship (central Poland)
Jeziorko, Wieluń County in Łódź Voivodeship (central Poland)
Jeziorko, Zduńska Wola County in Łódź Voivodeship (central Poland)
Jeziórko, Masovian Voivodeship (east-central Poland)
Jeziorko, Podlaskie Voivodeship (north-east Poland)
Jeziórko, Pomeranian Voivodeship (north Poland)
Jeziorko, Świętokrzyskie Voivodeship (south-central Poland)
Jeziorko, Braniewo County in Warmian-Masurian Voivodeship (north Poland)
Jeziorko, Giżycko County in Warmian-Masurian Voivodeship (north Poland)
Jeziorko, West Pomeranian Voivodeship (north-west Poland)